The 20th Game Developers Choice Awards was an annual awards ceremony by Game Developers Choice Awards for outstanding game developers and video games held on March 18, 2020, hosted by Kim Swift. Though normally held at the Game Developers Conference, due to the 2020 coronavirus outbreak, the conference was postponed to later in 2020, and the awards were presented via online streaming media, alongside the Independent Games Festival awards.

Kate Edwards, former head of the International Game Developers Association and current head of the Global Game Jam, will receive the Ambassador Award for her past and current work in the industry.

Following from a similar event with The Game Awards 2019, Geoff Keighley worked with several of the games featured in the Awards as well as other indie developers to present forty game demos to be available from March 18 to March 23 through Steam as part of the Steam Game Festival - Spring Edition. Keighley planned to offer further events throughout the year to tie to other award shows and game conferences. In addition to games that were featured as part of the GDC and IGF, the Steam Game Festival also featured demos from other GDC-sponsored events that had been affected by the pandemic such as the Indie Megabooth and the Day of the Devs.

Winners and Nominees
Nominees were announced on January 8, 2020, and winners (in bold below) named on March 18, 2020.

Game of the Year
 Untitled Goose Game (House House/Panic)
 Death Stranding (Kojima Productions/Sony Interactive Entertainment)
 Control (Remedy Entertainment/505 Games)
 Sekiro: Shadows Die Twice (FromSoftware/Activision)
 Outer Wilds (Mobius Digital/Annapurna Interactive)

Best Audio
 Control (Remedy Entertainment/505 Games) Death Stranding (Kojima Productions/Sony Interactive Entertainment)
 Sayonara Wild Hearts (Simogo/Annapurna Interactive)
 Untitled Goose Game (House House/Panic)
 Call of Duty: Modern Warfare (Infinity Ward/Activision)

Best Debut Developer
 ZA/UM (Disco Elysium) Mobius Digital (Outer Wilds)
 William Chyr Studios(Manifold Garden)
 Foam Sword Games (Knights and Bikes)
 Chance Agency (Neo Cab)

Best Design
 Baba Is You (Hempuli) Outer Wilds (Mobius Digital/Annapurna Interactive)
 Death Stranding (Kojima Productions/Sony Interactive Entertainment)
 Sekiro: Shadows Die Twice (FromSoftware/Activision)
 Untitled Goose Game (House House/Panic)

Best Mobile Game
 What the Golf? (Triband Productions/The Label Limited) Sayonara Wild Hearts (Simogo/Annapurna Interactive)
 Grindstone (Capybara Games)
 Sky: Children of the Light (thatgamecompany)
 Call of Duty: Mobile (TiMi Studios/Activision)

Innovation Award
 Baba Is You (Hempuli) Untitled Goose Game (House House/Panic)
 Disco Elysium (ZA/UM)
 Death Stranding (Kojima Productions/Sony Interactive Entertainment)
 Outer Wilds (Mobius Digital/Annapurna Interactive)

Best Narrative
 Disco Elysium (ZA/UM) Control (Remedy Entertainment/505 Games)
 Death Stranding (Kojima Productions/Sony Interactive Entertainment)
 The Outer Worlds (Obsidian Entertainment/Private Division)
 Outer Wilds (Mobius Digital/Annapurna Interactive)

Best Technology
 Control (Remedy Entertainment/505 Games) Death Stranding (Kojima Productions/Sony Interactive Entertainment)
 Call of Duty: Modern Warfare (Infinity Ward/Activision)
 Apex Legends (Respawn Entertainment/Electronic Arts)
 Noita (Nolla Games)

Best Visual Art
 Control (Remedy Entertainment/505 Games) Death Stranding (Kojima Productions/Sony Interactive Entertainment)
 Sekiro: Shadows Die Twice (FromSoftware/Activision)
 Sayonara Wild Hearts (Simogo/Annapurna Interactive)
 Disco Elysium (ZA/UM)

Best VR/AR Game
 Vader Immortal'' (ILMxLAB/Disney)
 Blood & Truth (SCEE Studio London/Sony Interactive Entertainment)
 Asgard's Wrath (Sanzaru Games/Oculus Studios)
 Boneworks (Stress Level Zero)
 Pistol Whip (Cloudhead Games)

Audience Award
 Sky: Children of the Light'' (Thatgamecompany)

Pioneer Award
 Roberta Williams

Ambassador Award
Kate Edwards

In Memorandum
The ceremony honored the following individuals that died over the prior year:

 Stephan Ash
 Keith Boesky
 Ryan Brant
 Jason Brookes
 Craig Goodman

 Anita Hamil Frazier
 Kazuhisa Hashimoto
 Steve Henifin
 Takashi Iwade
 Brad McQuaid

 Patrick Munnik
 Andy O'Neil
 Tim Skelly
 Mark Vitello
 Jose Zambrano

External links
Official website

References

2019 video game awards
2020 awards in the United States
2020 in video gaming
March 2020 events in the United States
Game Developers Choice Awards ceremonies